Brian H. Schoenjahn (born 1949) is an Iowa State Senator from the 12th District. A Democrat, he has served in the Iowa Senate since 2005.  He received his B.A. in Social Science and his M.A. in Political Science from the University of Northern Iowa.

Schoenjahn currently serves on several committees in the Iowa Senate - the Appropriations committee; the Judiciary committee; the Local Government committee; the Natural Resources committee; and the Education committee, where he is vice chair.  He also serves as chair of the Education Appropriations Subcommittee.  Prior political experience includes serving as mayor of Arlington, Iowa from 1977 to 2004.

Schoenjahn was re-elected in 2008 with 17,402 votes, defeating Republican opponent Rebecca Wearmouth.

Electoral history
Electoral history for Schoenjahn in the Iowa Senate.

References

External links

Senator Brian Schoenjahn official Iowa Legislature site
Senator Brian Schoenjahn official Iowa General Assembly site
State Senator Brian Schoenjahn official constituency site
 

1949 births
Living people
People from Fayette County, Iowa
University of Northern Iowa alumni
Mayors of places in Iowa
Democratic Party Iowa state senators
People from Carroll, Iowa
21st-century American politicians